Utilimaster is a subsidiary of The Shyft Group that manufactures multi-stop trucks. It was founded in 1973 in Wakarusa, Indiana. Previously owned by Holiday Rambler and then Harley-Davidson, it was bought by senior management along with an investment group led by Kirkland Messina for $65 million in 1996. 

On November 19, 2009, Spartan Motors (now named The Shyft Group) acquired Utilimaster for $45 million in an all-cash transaction. The Road Rescue division was sold to Allied Specialty Vehicles in 2010 by Spartan.

Utilimaster bought Union City Body Company, a competitor from Union City, Indiana, for an undisclosed amount on November 16, 2005. Union City Body had bought the General Motors chassis and commercial truck business in 1998.

Products

In the 1980s and 1990s, the company manufactured the aerodynamic Aeromate on an in-house, front-wheel drive chassis. The original model was introduced in August 1988 and used Chrysler's 2.5-liter inline-four engine known from the K-car. Later models used either the turbocharged version of Chrysler's 2.5-litre four or their 3.3-litre V6 engine, with the V6 being introduced for the 1991 model year.

In mid-1990, for the 1991 model year, Utilimaster introduced the larger Aeromaster Z2000.

In 2011, Isuzu and Utilimaster announced plans for Utilimaster to assemble the Isuzu Reach in their Wakarusa, Indiana, plant. It is a commercial step van with much better aerodynamics and a more fuel-efficient engine than other walk-in vans in the class, offering markedly better fuel efficiency.  On February 14, 2012, Utilimaster announced it would move from Wakarusa, Indiana, to nearby Bristol, Indiana.

In 2012, Utilimaster and Smith co-developed an integrated walk-in van design. Using Smith's Newton chassis platform. The Newton Step Van was available in configurations of 14,000 to 26,000 lbs. GVW and 650 to 1,200 cubic feet and provided a range of approximately 100 miles on a single charge.

In 2015, Utilimaster introduced the first walk-in cargo van named Velocity. The Velocity was the most fuel efficient walk-in van when introduced. The van was developed on the Ford Transit chassis, available in gas, diesel, or CNG/LPG configurations.

In 2020, at the NTEA's Work Truck Show, Utilimaster announced the Velocity M3, a walk-in cargo van built on the Mercedes Sprinter chassis.

In 2020, Utilimaster announced the Velocity F2, a sub-10,000 lbs. GVWR walk-in cargo van built on the Ford Transit chassis. The Velocity F2 combines the comfort, nimbleness, and fuel-efficiency of a cargo van, with the load capacity similar to a traditional walk-in delivery van.

References

External links
 

Motor vehicle manufacturers based in Indiana
Automotive companies of the United States
Companies based in Elkhart County, Indiana
Contract vehicle manufacturers